Archy Ivan Marshall (born 24 August 1994), also known by his stage name King Krule, among other names, is an English singer, songwriter, musician, rapper and record producer.

He began recording music in 2010 under the moniker Zoo Kid. The following year he adopted his present name. He has released several EPs and his debut full-length album, 6 Feet Beneath the Moon, was released in 2013 to positive critical reception. His third album, The Ooz, was released on 13 October 2017 and his fourth album, Man Alive!, was released on 21 February 2020 both to further critical acclaim.

His music blends elements of punk jazz with hip hop, darkwave, trip hop and post-punk. 

He currently resides in Liverpool.

Early life
Archy Marshall was born to Rachel Howard and Adam Marshall in Southwark, London. He has family in the Czech Republic. During an interview with The Guardians Rob Fitzpatrick, Marshall said that from a young age, he experienced discipline issues and refused to go to school. Throughout his childhood, he spent much of his time between his father's house in Peckham and his mother's house in East Dulwich; his mother was much less strict than his father, who had many rules. Marshall recalls that his father had to physically carry him to school, otherwise he would skip and hide in his room. Once he turned 13 years old, he was given a private house tutor. He was later accepted into the Brit School to study art, where he struggled with discipline initially, but soon found his place.

Marshall has said that he was tested for several mental health conditions at London's Maudsley Hospital. He claims that the tests took a toll on him; that the doctors, counsellors and psychiatrists were wrong most of the time; that he hated everybody; and that he would hide in his room for hours on end. He refers to his mental health issues, such as depression and insomnia, in some of his lyrics.

During an interview with NPR, Marshall recalled that he often created art in many different media, as his parents encouraged creativity throughout his childhood. He noted that visual art in particular is important to him, and he mentioned that he carefully crafts his music videos and album art such that they reflect his particular aesthetic sensibility.

Career 
During Marshall's years at Forest Hill School and then at the Brit School alongside long-time collaborator Jamie Isaac between 2008 and 2011, he released two singles as "Zoo Kid". He created a genre of music called "Bluewave" and its form was realised in the mixtape entitled U.F.O.W.A.V.E. In July 2011, Marshall began playing under a new moniker, King Krule, at a festival in Hyères, France. Later that year he released his eponymous debut EP. Contrary to some reports, his stage name is not inspired by the character of King K. Rool from the Donkey Kong Country video game series, but rather by the Elvis Presley film King Creole.

On 9 December 2012, the BBC announced that he had been nominated for the Sound of 2013 poll.

King Krule released his debut album 6 Feet Beneath the Moon on 24 August 2013, his 19th birthday. More than half of the tracks had already been released on his EPs. This brought him to prominence, especially in the US, with performances on Conan and the Late Show with David Letterman.

On 8 January 2014, he released a video for "A Lizard State" which gained over 800,000 views on YouTube. In February 2014, King Krule appeared on the cover of The Fader in its 90th issue.

In December 2015, under the name Archy Marshall, he released an album titled A New Place 2 Drown, which includes 12 songs, a 208-page book of visual art and text and a ten-minute documentary. He partnered with his brother, Jack Marshall, on this project. In an interview with NPR, Marshall said that he wanted the album to have a physical component, as well as something for the eyes and the ears. He released the album under the name Archy Marshall rather than King Krule to differentiate between the two different genres of music, as he claims that he thought of A New Place 2 Drown as a hip hop album rather than the dark alternative/jazz sound of 6 Feet Beneath the Moon.

Marshall took to NTS Radio, hosted by Mount Kimbie, and released two songs under the name Edgar the Beatmaker. The first song is untitled, and the second is titled "When and Why". In August 2017, Marshall released a new song entitled "Czech One". This was a King Krule release, the first since the release of his debut album in 2013. In September 2017, Marshall released a new song entitled "Dum Surfer", released under the name King Krule. On 13 October, Marshall released his second full album The Ooz under King Krule. It included the singles released in the previous two months as well as 17 new songs. The album received positive reviews, and was ranked the #83 most discussed album of 2017 and the 75th most shared album of 2017 according to Metacritic. The album ranked 23 out of 100 on Official Chart Ranking and was ranked 8.7 out of 10 based on 56 ratings. Pitchfork named the album the best rock album of 2017 and the third best album overall of 2017. It was nominated for IMPALA's European Album of the Year Award.

On 8 March 2018 a live performance of songs from "The Ooz" was uploaded to the Molten Jets youtube channel, titled "King Krule - Live from the moon". This performance consisted of 8 different songs and was directed by Ja Humby.

On 14 January 2020, Marshall announced his third King Krule album titled Man Alive! and released the single "(Don't Let the Dragon) Draag On" , as well as the single "Alone, Omen 3" on 5 February. Days before the album release, he released the single "Cellular" along with an animated music video, directed by Jamie Wolfe. The album was released on 21 February. On 10 September 2021, King Krule released the live album You Heat Me Up, You Cool Me Down.

Musical style and influences
Many reviewers and journalists have noted King Krule's unusual transcendence and appropriation of disparate genres. His music has been described mainly with jazz derivatives such as punk jazz and jazz fusion, but also as darkwave, post-punk and hip hop. Writers have also noted elements of trip hop, jazz rap and dub in some of his songs. Jason Lymangrover of Allmusic states that his songs are mainly in the form of ballads with major seventh chords, but by contrast there is also a "grittiness" to Archy's voice and persona, portraying him as "the type of kid who would be quick to throw a punch without asking questions."

His music has been likened to Morrissey and Edwyn Collins. He is inspired by disparate influences such as Elvis Presley, Gene Vincent, Josef K, Chet Baker, Fela Kuti, J Dilla, Billy Bragg, Aztec Camera (his godfather is the band's former drummer, Dave Ruffy) and The Penguin Cafe Orchestra. Marshall said in an interview with The Guardian that he began his musical career with the influence of Pixies and The Libertines.

Marshall's lyrics, according to a Flaunt magazine interview, generally consist of romance, sex, aggression, conflict, and depression. These themes link to his literary influences, in which Marshall further elaborated: "Literature, poems, songs are all very similar[.] I used to read lots of poetry and sit there for ages trying to decipher the meaning, or work out the narration behind it all, then I found my own form of that. [...] you can see how their metaphors develop and understand their uses. So really, I learnt to do that for myself."

Personal life
Marshall is in a relationship with English photographer Charlotte Patmore. Patmore has been a collaborator with him on photography and videography projects for several years, and has been involved with several of his music videos, including the video for the song "Cadet Limbo", which Patmore directed. In 2019 Patmore directed Hey World!, a video preceding the release of Marshall's album Man Alive!. They have one child, a daughter born in 2019.

Live band
 Archy Marshall – vocals, guitar, keyboards
 James Wilson – bass, vocals
 George Bass – drums
 Jack Towell – guitar 
 Jamie Isaac – electronics
 Ignacio Salvadores – saxophone

Discography

Studio albums

Live albums 
 2018: Live on the Moon (XL/True Panther Sounds/Matador)
2021: You Heat Me Up, You Cool Me Down (XL/True Panther Sounds/Matador)

EPs 
 2010: U.F.O.W.A.V.E. (self-released; as Zoo Kid)
 2010: Out Getting Ribs/Has This Hit 7" – single (House Anxiety Records; as Zoo Kid)
 2011: King Krule EP (True Panther)
 2012: Rock Bottom/Octopus 12" single (Rinse)

Other 
 2014: City Rivims Mk 1 (self-released; w/ Sub Luna City)

Guest appearances

Awards and nominations

References

External links 

1994 births
Living people
English punk rock musicians
English male singer-songwriters
People educated at the BRIT School
English baritones
XL Recordings artists
British trip hop musicians
21st-century English singers
21st-century British male singers
People from Southwark